All the President's Men is a 1974 non-fiction book by Carl Bernstein and Bob Woodward, two of the journalists who investigated the June 1972 break-in at the Watergate Office Building and the resultant political scandal for The Washington Post. The book chronicles the investigative reporting of Woodward and Bernstein from Woodward's initial report on the Watergate break-in through the resignations of Nixon Administration officials H. R. Haldeman and John Ehrlichman in April 1973, and the revelation of the Oval Office Watergate tapes by Alexander Butterfield three months later. It relates the events behind the major stories the duo wrote for the Post, naming some sources who had previously refused to be identified for their initial articles, notably Hugh Sloan. It also gives detailed accounts of Woodward's secret meetings with his source Deep Throat, whose identity was kept hidden for over 30 years. Gene Roberts, the former executive editor of The Philadelphia Inquirer and former managing editor of The New York Times, has called the work of Woodward and Bernstein "maybe the single greatest reporting effort of all time."

A film adaptation, produced by Robert Redford, starring Redford and Dustin Hoffman as Woodward and Bernstein, respectively, was released in 1976.  That same year, a sequel to the book, The Final Days, was published, which chronicled the last months of Richard Nixon's presidency, starting around the time their previous book ended.

Background
Woodward and Bernstein had considered the idea of writing a book about Watergate, but did not commit until actor Robert Redford expressed interest in purchasing the film rights. In Telling the Truth About Lies: The Making of "All the President's Men", Woodward noted that Redford played an important role in changing the book's narrative from a story about the Watergate events to one about their investigations and reportage of the story.

The name of the book alludes to the nursery rhyme about Humpty Dumpty ("All the king's horses and all the king's men / Couldn't put Humpty together again"). An allusion similar to that was made more explicitly a quarter-century earlier in Robert Penn Warren's 1946 novel All the King's Men, which describes the career of a fictional corrupt governor, loosely based on Huey Long.

Important individuals

The President
Richard Nixon

The President's Men
(listed with their 1972 positions in either the president's executive staff or in his re-election committee, where applicable)

White House

Alexander P. Butterfield, Deputy Assistant to the President
Dwight L. Chapin, Deputy Assistant to the President
Ken W. Clawson, Deputy Director of Communications for the President
Charles W. Colson, Chief Counsel for the President
John W. Dean III, White House Counsel
John D. Ehrlichman, Counsel and Assistant to the President for Domestic Affairs
H.R. Haldeman, White House Chief of Staff
E. Howard Hunt, Jr., President's Special Investigations Unit ("White House Plumbers")
Henry A. Kissinger, National Security Advisor
Egil Krogh, Jr., head of the President's Special Investigations Unit ("White House Plumbers")
Gerald Warren, White House Press Secretary, succeeding Ziegler
David R. Young, special assistant at the National Security Council
Ronald L. Ziegler, White House Press Secretary

Committee to Re-elect the President (CRP)

Kenneth H. Dahlberg, CRP's Midwest finance chairman
Herbert W. Kalmbach, personal attorney to United States President Richard Nixon and Deputy Finance Chairman of CRP
G. Gordon Liddy, CRP employee
Clark MacGregor, CRP Chairman
Jeb Stuart Magruder, Deputy Director, and assistant to the Director of CRP
Robert C. Mardian, CRP political coordinator
John N. Mitchell, Attorney General, and CRP campaign director
Robert C. Odle, Jr., Director of Administration ("office manager") for CRP
Kenneth W. Parkinson, CRP counsel
Herbert L. Porter, CRP organizer and former White House aide
Donald H. Segretti, political operative for CRP
Hugh W. Sloan, Jr., CRP treasurer
Judy Hoback Miller, CRP bookkeeper 
Maurice H. Stans, CRP finance chairman
Gordon C. Strachan, staff assistant to Herbert G. Klein but was assigned to be H.R. Haldeman's liaison to CRP

Rest of the President's Men

Alfred C. Baldwin III
John J. Caulfield
L. Patrick Gray III, acting Director of the Federal Bureau of Investigation
Richard G. Kleindienst, Attorney General (succeeding John Mitchell)
Fred LaRue, no rank, title, salary or even listing in the White House directory
Powell Moore
Kenneth Rietz
DeVan L. Shumway

The Burglars
Bernard L. Barker
Virgilio R. Gonzalez
Eugenio R. Martinez
James W. McCord, Jr.
Frank A. Sturgis

The Prosecutors
Henry E. Petersen, United States Assistant Attorney General
Earl J. Silbert, United States Attorney for the District of Columbia
Donald E. Campbell, Assistant U.S. Attorney
Seymour Glanzer, Assistant United States Attorney for the District of Columbia

The Judge
John J. Sirica, District Judge for the United States District Court for the District of Columbia

The Washington Post

Carl Bernstein, Reporter
Bob Woodward, Reporter
Benjamin C. Bradlee, Executive Editor
Katharine Graham, Publisher
Harry M. Rosenfeld, Metropolitan Editor
Howard Simons, Managing Editor
Barry Sussman, City Desk Editor
Brett Gurganious, Local News Reporter

The Senator
Sam Ervin (D-NC), chair of the Senate Watergate Committee

The Informant
 Deep Throat (revealed in 2005 to be W. Mark Felt)

Publication 
Dick Snyder of Simon & Schuster purchased the right to publish the book through the agent David Obst. The authors received an advance of $55,000. In his memoir, Michael Korda said of the book's publication that it "transformed book publishing into a red-hot part of media" and books became "news" instead of history.

Because the book was embargoed until publication day, there were no advance copies for reviewers. Simon & Schuster became known as the "Watergate" publisher by following up All the President's Men with books by John Dean, Maureen Dean, John Ehrlichman and John Mitchell.

See also
 All the Prime Minister's Men, 2021 documentary
 The Final Days, 1976 book

References

External links
The Woodward and Bernstein Watergate Papers, an exhibition at the University of Texas at Austin
40 years later retrospective joint interview on CBS
CBS News: Watergate: High Crimes in the White House, 50th Anniversary

1974 non-fiction books
Books about journalism
Books about the Watergate scandal
Books by Bob Woodward
Books by Carl Bernstein
Collaborative non-fiction books
English-language books
Non-fiction books adapted into films
Simon & Schuster books
The Washington Post